Parasitiphis is a genus of mites in the family Ologamasidae. There are at least four described species in Parasitiphis.

Species
These four species belong to the genus Parasitiphis:
 Parasitiphis aurora Lee, 1970
 Parasitiphis brunneus (Kramer, 1898)
 Parasitiphis jeanneli (André, 1947)
 Parasitiphis littoralis Womersley, 1956

References

Ologamasidae